Lyu Jian (also known as "Lu Jian") is currently President of Nanjing University, China and a professor in Computer Science.

Early life
Lyu Jian was born in Nanjing, Jiangsu Province, China in 1960. He studied Computer Science at Nanjing University
and received his bachelor's degree in 1983, master's degree in 1984 and Ph.D. in 1988.

Career
After his Ph.D., he joined Nanjing University as an assistant professor. He went to Manchester University, 
UK as a visiting scholar from 1993 - 1994. In 2010, he became vice president of Nanjing University. In 2018, 
he was appointed President of the university.

Research
Lyu Jian has performed research in computer software, software methodology, network software, agent technology, middleware, pervasive computing, software collaboration technology, and web security. He has given research seminars at various universities.

Awards
Lyu Jian received the Natural Science award and the Technological Invention award from Ministry of Education, China. In 2013, he was elected as a member of Chinese Academy of Sciences.

References

1960 births
Living people
Nanjing University alumni
Chinese computer scientists
Members of the Chinese Academy of Sciences